Bangladesh Shishu Academy is the national academy for children in Bangladesh. It was established in 1976 for promoting cultural development of children, and nurturing their talents.

List of Chairpersons
 Zobeda Khanum
 Zubaida Gulshan Ara
 Sheikh Abdul Ahad
 Selina Hossain (23 April 2014 – )
 Lucky Enam (25 September 2019 – present)

Shishu Academy Award
 Agrani Bank Shishu Academy Children's Literature Award
 Bangladesh Shishu Academy Award for Literature. The academy adorns one Bangladeshi litterateur with the award for his/her overall contribution in the field of juvenile literature. The award was introduced in 1396 BS (1989 Gregorian). A poet or a litterateur is entitled to this award once during his lifetime. No provision is made for giving the award posthumously. The awardee is entitled to an amount of taka twenty five thousand in cash, one crest and a certificate of honour.
 Agrani Bank Award for Juvenile Literature is given to an individual for outstanding juvenile book or illustration in a particular year. It was given in four major branches such as: Chhora, Kobita o Gan (Rhyme, poetry and song), Angkan (Illustration), Galpo, Uponnash, Rupkatha (Short story, novel and fairy tale), and Shyastho, Biggyan o Projukti (Health, science and technology). Before introducing Bangladesh Shishu Academy Award in 1396 BS, this was the major national award for children's literature.

See also
Culture of Bangladesh
Bangla Academy
National Child Award

References

External links
 Bangladesh Shishu Academy Official website
 Article on Shishu Academy, Banglapedia

Civil awards and decorations of Bangladesh
Cultural organisations based in Bangladesh
1976 establishments in Bangladesh
Government agencies of Bangladesh
Bangladeshi children